"Papa Was a Rollin' Stone" is a song originally performed by Motown recording act the Undisputed Truth in 1972, though it became much better known after a Grammy-award winning cover by the Temptations was issued later the same year.  This latter version of the song became a number-one hit on the Billboard Hot 100.

"Papa Was a Rollin' Stone" was written by Norman Whitfield and Barrett Strong in 1971.  Whitfield produced the original Undisputed Truth version, which was released as a single in May 1972. This version of the song peaked at number 63 on the Pop Charts and number 24 on the R&B Charts. The song was included on the Undisputed Truth's album Law of the Land (1973).

Later in 1972, Whitfield cut a different version of the song, turning it into a 12-minute track for the Temptations.  This version was included on their 1972 album All Directions.  The edited 7-inch single release of this Temptations track was issued in September 1972, and this version was a number-one hit on the Billboard Hot 100 and won three Grammy Awards in 1973. While the original Undisputed Truth version of the song has been largely forgotten, the Temptations' version of the song has been regarded as an enduring and influential soul classic. The full-length album version was ranked number 169 on Rolling Stones list of the 500 Greatest Songs of All Time, one of the group's three songs on the list. In retrospect, the Temptations' Otis Williams considers the song to be the last real classic the group recorded (it would be the Temptations' last number one hit and would win them their second and final Grammy Award in a competitive category).

Overview
Beginning with an extended instrumental introduction (3:53 in length), each of the song's three verses is separated by extended musical passages, in which Whitfield brings various instrumental textures in and out of the mix. A solo plucked bass guitar part, backed by hi-hat cymbals drumming, establishes the musical theme, a simple three-note figure; the bass is gradually joined by other instruments, including a blues guitar, wah-wah guitar, electric piano, handclaps, strings and solo trumpet; all are tied together by the ever-present bass guitar line and repeating hi-hat rhythm.

The official album version of the song is 12:04 not 11:45 as stated on the record label. When All Directions was issued on CD, it was shorter at 11:45. The full LP version is featured on the Temptations' Psychedelic Soul compilation.

Vocal duties are performed in a true ensemble style: Temptations singers Dennis Edwards, Melvin Franklin, Richard Street (who was a frequent fill-in for Paul Williams and his eventual replacement) and Damon Harris (who had replaced Eddie Kendricks as the group's falsetto singer the previous year) alternate vocal lines, taking the role of siblings questioning their mother about their now-dead father; their increasingly pointed questions, and the mother's repeated response ("Papa was a rollin' stone/wherever he laid his hat was his home/and when he died, all he left us was alone") paint a somber picture for the children who have never seen their father and have "never heard nothing but bad things about him."

Friction arose during the recording of "Papa Was a Rollin' Stone" for a number of reasons. The Temptations did not like the fact that Whitfield's instrumentation had been getting more emphasis than their vocals on their songs at the time, and that they had to press Whitfield to get him to produce ballads for the group. Whitfield forced Edwards to re-record his parts dozens of times until he finally got the angered, bitter grumble he desired out of the usually fiery-toned Edwards. Whitfield's treatment of the group eventually led to his dismissal as their producer. Legend has it that Edwards was angered by the song's first verse: "It was the third of September/That day I'll always remember/'cause that was the day/that my daddy died", as his father was said to have died on the third of September. Edwards's father died on the third of October.

The solo trumpet part in the introduction was played by Funk Brothers member Maurice Davis; guitar parts were played by fellow member Melvin "Wah-Wah Watson" Ragin and a young Paul Warren. The Temptations' version of "Papa Was a Rollin' Stone" followed in the extended-length "cinematic soul" tradition of the work of Isaac Hayes and others, and future songs like Donna Summer's 14-minute "Love to Love You Baby" and the instrumentals of MFSB expanded upon the concept in the mid-1970s.

Release
A seven-minute edited version of "Papa Was a Rollin' Stone" was released as a single in September 1972. For this mix, congas were added to bolster the song's sparse percussion; this version appeared on the 1973 Anthology triple LP. The Temptations' box set Emperors of Soul has the edited version in stereo, but without the congas. The B-side was the instrumental backing by the Funk Brothers without the Temptations' vocals (though Damon Harris' final chorus is included after a single "Unngh!" at the end of the second verse), this version appears on the Funk Brothers' 2003 compilation 20th Century Masters: The Millennium Collection.

Reception
"Papa Was a Rollin' Stone" rose to number one on the U.S. pop charts and number five on the U.S. R&B charts, becoming the Temptations' final pop number-one hit. The song, the anchor of the 1972 Temptations album All Directions, won three 1973 Grammys: its A-side won for Best R&B Vocal Performance by a Group; its B-side won for Best R&B Instrumental (awarded to Whitfield and arranger/conductor Paul Riser); and Whitfield and Barrett Strong won for Best R&B Song as the song's composers.

Kelefa Sanneh described the song as, "nearly seven glorious minutes long (the album version was twelve) sustained by little more than a perfect bassline and a few artfully placed hand claps".

Stereogum called it, "a monolith. A towering monument out of tense hi-hats and pulsating bass and shivering strings and hard-strutting chicken-scratch guitars and panicked trumpet-blasts.  And the merciless four-four stomp-clap beat predicted not just disco but house music, as well."

Covers and remixes
 "Papa Was a Rollin' Stone" was sampled in the 1973 break-in record, "Super Fly Meets Shaft" (US No. 31).
 Bill "Wolf" Wolfer created an electronic cover of the song for his 1983 debut album Wolf. The single peaked at number 55 on the Billboard Hot 100 in January 1983, as well as number 47 on the R&B Charts. Michael Jackson provided backing vocals.
 The group Was (Not Was) covered the song on their 1990 album Are You Okay?. Their version reached number 12 in the UK.
 George Michael performed Papa Was a Rollin' Stone live at the Wembley Arena and released it in a remixed version together with Adamski song "Killer" on the 1993 EP Five Live. It was released as a single and charted at number 69 on the US Billboard Hot 100.
Rap trio Migos utilized the Temptations version as their main sample on the track "Avalanche" off their 2021 album Culture III.
The Black Crowes covered the song in a live performance on Jimmy Kimmel Live! on May 6, 2022, the day their EP 1972 was released.

Charts

The Temptations version

Remix version

Was (Not Was) version

Certifications

Personnel

Undisputed Truth version
 Lead and background vocals by Joe Harris, Billie Rae Calvin, and Brenda Joyce

Temptations version
 Lead vocals by Dennis Edwards, Melvin Franklin, Richard Street, and Damon Harris
 Background vocals by Dennis Edwards, Melvin Franklin, Richard Street, Damon Harris, and Otis Williams
 Arranged and conducted by Paul Riser
Instrumentation by the Funk Brothers (specific musicians listed below) and the Detroit Symphony Orchestra
Guitars by Melvin "Wah Wah Watson" Ragin and Paul Warren
Fender Rhodes Electric Piano by Earl Van Dyke
Organ by Johnny Griffith
Trumpet by Maurice Davis
Bass by Bob Babbitt or Leroy Taylor
Drums by Aaron Smith

References

External links
 
 List of cover versions of ”Papa Was a Rollin' Stone” at SecondHandSongs.com

1972 songs
1972 singles
1987 singles
Songs written by Barrett Strong
Songs written by Norman Whitfield
The Temptations songs
Was (Not Was) songs
Billboard Hot 100 number-one singles
Cashbox number-one singles
Funk songs
Motown singles
Gordy Records singles
Grammy Hall of Fame Award recipients
Psychedelic soul songs
Songs about loneliness
Song recordings produced by Norman Whitfield
Songs about fathers
1972 neologisms
Quotations from music